List of Antarctic expeditions by the Soviet Union is a list of expeditions from the Soviet Union to Antarctica.

Expeditions ordered by date

See also 
 Soviet Antarctic Expedition
 List of Antarctic expeditions
 List of Russian explorers

 List
Expeditions by the Soviet Union
Soviet Antarctic